Francisco Arcilla Aller (born 14 January 1984) is a male Spanish racewalker. He competed in the 50 kilometres walk event at the 2015 World Championships in Athletics in Beijing, China.

Competition record

See also
 Spain at the 2015 World Championships in Athletics

References

Spanish male racewalkers
Living people
Place of birth missing (living people)
1984 births
World Athletics Championships athletes for Spain
Athletes (track and field) at the 2016 Summer Olympics
Olympic athletes of Spain